The Kaczmarz method or Kaczmarz's algorithm is an iterative algorithm for solving linear equation systems . It was first discovered by the Polish mathematician Stefan Kaczmarz, and was rediscovered in the field of image reconstruction from projections by Richard Gordon, Robert Bender, and Gabor Herman in 1970, where it is called the Algebraic Reconstruction Technique (ART). ART includes the positivity constraint, making it nonlinear.

The Kaczmarz method is applicable to any linear system of equations, but its computational advantage relative to other methods depends on the system being sparse. It has been demonstrated to be superior, in some biomedical imaging applications, to other methods such as the filtered backprojection method.

It has many applications ranging from computed tomography (CT) to signal processing. It can be obtained also by applying to the hyperplanes, described by the linear system, the method of successive projections onto convex sets (POCS).

Algorithm 1: Kaczmarz algorithm
For  compute:

If the system is consistent,  converges to the minimum-norm solution, provided that the iterations start with the zero vector.

A more general algorithm can be defined using a relaxation parameter 

 

There are versions of the method that converge to a regularized weighted least squares solution when applied to a system of inconsistent equations and, at least as far as initial behavior is concerned, at a lesser cost than other iterative methods, such as the conjugate gradient method.

Algorithm 2: Randomized Kaczmarz algorithm
In 2009, a randomized version of the Kaczmarz method for overdetermined linear systems was introduced by Thomas Strohmer and Roman Vershynin in which the i-th equation is selected randomly with probability proportional to 

This method can be seen as a particular case of stochastic gradient descent.

Theorem.

Proof
We have

Using

we can write as

 with probability 

Then says that

Now we are ready to analyze our algorithm. The orthogonality of these two vectors then yields

To complete the proof, we have to bound  from below.

where  are independent realizations of the random vector 

Thus

Now we take the expectation of both sides conditional upon the choice of the random vectors  (hence we fix the choice of the random projections  and thus the random vectors  and we average over the random vector ). Then

By and the independence,

Taking the full expectation of both sides, we conclude that

The superiority of this selection was illustrated with the reconstruction of a bandlimited function from its nonuniformly spaced sampling values. However, it has been pointed out that the reported success by Strohmer and Vershynin depends on the specific choices that were made there in translating the underlying problem, whose geometrical nature is to find a common point of a set of hyperplanes, into a system of algebraic equations. There will always be legitimate algebraic representations of the underlying problem for which the selection method in will perform in an inferior manner.

The Kaczmarz iteration has a purely geometric interpretation: the algorithm successively projects the current iterate onto the hyperplane defined by the next equation. Hence, any scaling of the equations is irrelevant; it can also be seen from  that any (nonzero) scaling of the equations cancels out. Thus, in RK, one can use  or any other weights that may be relevant. Specifically, in the above-mentioned reconstruction example, the equations were chosen with probability proportional to the average distance of each sample point from its two nearest neighbors — a concept introduced by Feichtinger and Gröchenig. For additional progress on this topic, see, and the references therein.

Algorithm 3: Gower-Richtarik algorithm 
In 2015, Robert M. Gower and Peter Richtarik developed a versatile randomized iterative method for solving a consistent system of linear equations  which includes the randomized Kaczmarz algorithm as a special case. Other special cases include randomized coordinate descent, randomized Gaussian descent and randomized Newton method. Block versions and versions with importance sampling of all these methods also arise as special cases. The method is shown to enjoy exponential rate decay (in expectation) - also known as linear convergence, under very mild conditions on the way randomness enters the algorithm. The Gower-Richtarik method is the first algorithm uncovering a "sibling" relationship between these methods, some of which were independently proposed before, while many of which were new.

Insights about Randomized Kaczmarz
Interesting new insights about the randomized Kaczmarz method that can be gained from the analysis of the method include:

 The general rate of the Gower-Richtarik algorithm precisely recovers the rate of the randomized Kaczmarz method in the special case when it reduced to it.
 The choice of probabilities for which the randomized Kaczmarz algorithm was originally formulated and analyzed (probabilities proportional to the squares of the row norms) is not optimal. Optimal probabilities are the solution of a certain semidefinite program. The theoretical complexity of randomized Kaczmarz with the optimal probabilities can be arbitrarily better than the complexity for the standard probabilities. However, the amount by which it is better depends on the matrix . There are problems for which the standard probabilities are optimal.

Six Equivalent Formulations
The Gower-Richtarik method enjoys six seemingly different but equivalent formulations, shedding additional light on how to interpret it (and, as a consequence, how to interpret its many variants, including randomized Kaczmarz):

 1. Sketching viewpoint: Sketch & Project
 2. Optimization viewpoint: Constrain and Approximate
 3. Geometric viewpoint: Random Intersect
 4. Algebraic viewpoint 1: Random Linear Solve
 5. Algebraic viewpoint 2: Random Update
 6. Analytic viewpoint: Random Fixed Point

We now describe some of these viewpoints. The method depends on 2 parameters:

 a positive definite matrix  giving rise to a weighted Euclidean inner product  and the induced norm 

1. Sketch and Project
Given previous iterate  the new point  is computed by drawing a random matrix  (in an iid fashion from some fixed distribution), and setting

That is,  is obtained as the projection of  onto the randomly sketched system . The idea behind this method is to pick  in such a way that a projection onto the sketched system is substantially simpler than the solution of the original system .

2. Constrain and Approximate
A seemingly different but entirely equivalent formulation of the method (obtained via Lagrangian duality) is

where  is also allowed to vary, and where  is any solution of the system  Hence,  is obtained by first constraining the update to the linear subspace spanned by the columns of the random matrix , i.e., to

and then choosing the point  from this subspace which best approximates . This formulation may look surprising as it seems impossible to perform the approximation step due to the fact that  is not known (after all, this is what we are trying the compute!). However, it is still possible to do this, simply because  computed this way is the same as  computed via the sketch and project formulation and since  does not appear there.

5. Random Update
The update can also be written explicitly as

where by  we denote the Moore-Penrose pseudo-inverse of matrix . Hence, the method can be written in the form , where  is a random update vector.

Letting  it can be shown that the system  always has a solution , and that for all such solutions the vector  is the same. The pseudo-inverse leads just to one particular solution. The role of the pseudo-inverse is twofold:

 It allows the method to be written in the explicit "random update" form as above,
 It makes the analysis simple through the final, sixth, formulation.

6. Random Fixed Point 
If we subtract  from both sides of the random update formula, denote

and use the fact that  we arrive at the last formulation:

where  is the identity matrix. The iteration matrix,  is random, whence the name of this formulation.

Convergence
By taking conditional expectations in the 6th formulation (conditional on ), we obtain

By taking expectation again, and using the tower property of expectations, we obtain

Gower and Richtarik show that

where the matrix norm is defined by

Moreover, without any assumptions on  one has  By taking norms and unrolling the recurrence, we obtain

Theorem [Gower & Richtarik 2015]

Remark. A sufficient condition for the expected residuals to converge to 0 is  This can be achieved if  has a full column rank and under very mild conditions on  Convergence of the method can be established also without the full column rank assumption in a different way.

It is also possible to show a stronger result:

Theorem [Gower & Richtarik 2015]
The expected squared norms (rather than norms of expectations) converge at the same rate:

Remark. This second type of convergence is stronger due to the following identity which holds for any random vector  and any fixed vector :

Convergence of Randomized Kaczmarz

Further Special Cases

Algorithm 4: PLSS-Kaczmarz 
Since the convergence of the (randomized) Kaczmarz method depends on a rate of convergence the method may make slow progress on some practical problems. To ensure finite termination of the method, Johannes Brust and Michael Saunders (academic)
 have developed a process that generalizes the (randomized) Kaczmarz iteration and
terminates in at most  iterations to a solution for the consistent system . The process is based on Dimensionality reduction, or projections
onto lower dimensional spaces, which is how it derives its name PLSS (Projected Linear Systems Solver). An iteration of PLSS-Kaczmarz can be regarded as the generalization

 

A randomized version of the method uses 
The iteration converges to a solution when  . In particular, since  it holds that

 

and therefore  is a solution to the linear system. The computation of iterates in PLSS-Kaczmarz can be simplified and organized effectively.
The resulting algorithm only requires matrix-vector products and has a direct form

 algorithm PLSS-Kaczmarz is
     input: matrix A right hand side b
     output: solution x such that Ax=b
 
     x := 0, P = [0]
     for k in 1,2,...,m do
         
         a := A(ik,:)'                   // Select an index ik in 1,...,m without resampling
         d := P' * a        
         c1 := norm(a)
         c2 := norm(d)
         c3 := (bik-x'*a)/((c1-c2)*(c1+c2))
         p := c3*(a - P*(P'*a))
         P := [ P, p/norm(p) ]           // Append a normalized update         x := x + p
 
     return x''

Notes

References

External links
 A randomized Kaczmarz algorithm with exponential convergence
 Comments on the randomized Kaczmarz method

Numerical linear algebra
Medical imaging
Signal processing